2001 World Cup can refer to:

The 2001 Alpine Skiing World Cup
2001 Baseball World Cup
2001 Rugby World Cup Sevens
2001 ISSF World Cup
2001 Speedway World Cup

See also
 2001 Continental Championships (disambiguation)
 2001 World Championships (disambiguation)
 2001 World Junior Championships (disambiguation)